David Cherrill (born Christopher David Colson; December 23, 1941) is an American television actor, writer and director.

Credits

Days of Our Lives (2008–2017)
One Life to Live (hired by Michael Malone; 1995–1997, 2001–2004)
Another World (hired by Dorothy Ann Purser; 1984–1989)
As the World Turns (Actor: Tom Hughes 1973–78) (1998–1999)
Search for Tomorrow (1983)
The Doctors (1977–1982)
Shipman
The Last Minute
Far from the Madding Crowd
A Touch of Frost
Shadowchaser
Soldier Soldier
The Bill
Adderly
Boon
A Woman of Substance
Space Riders
On the Third Day
Minder
The Professionals
A Passage to India
Eureka
Dunkirk
How to Be a Little Sod

Awards and nominations
He's been nominated for 6 Daytime Emmy Awards (1985, 1989, 1994–1996 and 2002); winning in 1994, and a Writers Guild of America Award. His first nomination was shared with Gary Tomlin,
Samuel D. Ratcliffe,
Judith Donato,
Richard Culliton,
Judith Pinsker,
Frances Myers,
Roger Newman,
Carolyn Culliton,
David Colson,
Lloyd Gold, and
Cynthia Saltzman.

References

External links
http://www.imdb.com/name/nm1250955/
https://web.archive.org/web/20120219141424/http://www.ampmgt.com/david_cherrill.htm
https://www.variety.com/review/VE1117799097.html?categoryid=31&cs=1
https://web.archive.org/web/20110615094251/http://tv.yahoo.com/show/the-life-and-crimes-of-william-palmer/show/15100/castcrew
https://web.archive.org/web/20080316015357/http://www.inspiredmovies.com/english/take3girls-closingcredits
http://www.mediagems.de/01filmtv/between.html
https://web.archive.org/web/20160310113415/http://www.nytimes.com/movies/person/680679/David-Cherrill

American television writers
American male television writers
1941 births
Living people